The 1946 Cotton Bowl Classic was a postseason college football bowl game between the tenth ranked Texas Longhorns and the Missouri Tigers.

Background
Texas was led by star quarterback, Bobby Layne.

Game summary
Layne accounted for all 40 of Texas' points. He rushed for three touchdowns, passed for two touchdowns (both caught by Joe Baumgardner) and caught a touchdown pass from Ralph Ellsworth. Texas led the whole game, from 14-7 at the end of the first, 21-14 at halftime and 27-14 at the end of the third quarter. Missouri had three touchdown runs from William Dellastatious, Howard Bennett, and Robert Hopkins with a touchdown catch from Roland Oakes, but the Tigers could not stop Layne, who went 11 of 12 for 158 yards.

Statistics

References

Cotton Bowl
Cotton Bowl Classic
Missouri Tigers football bowl games
Texas Longhorns football bowl games
January 1946 sports events in the United States
Cotton Bowl